S.S. Lazio Calcio Gaelico, also known as Lazio GAA, is a Gaelic Athletic Association (GAA) club based in Rome, Italy.

The club caters for men and ladies' Gaelic football and is part of Polisportiva Lazio, the biggest European multi-sport club known for their association football team. The teams play in the Central-East region of Europe GAA. It is one of the three Italian teams, among with Ascaro Rovigo and Padova Gaelic Football, recognized by GAA.

Originally the club was founded and known as Rome Gaelic Football by an owner of one of the most famous Irish pubs in Rome. Their kits were green and black.

In 2015 they obtained affiliation with Lazio and changed their name, crest and kit colours, now sky and white. The crest is the common symbol of S.S. Lazio, an imperial eagle with a Celtic cross, Polisportiva's Latin motto Concordia parvae res crescunt ("In harmony little things rise") and a Red Hand of Ulster to pay homage to the founder of the former Rome GC club Christopher Taggart, born in County Tyrone. Kits were supplied by Legea for the first two years and now by O'Neills.

Despite its recent foundation, the club has known worldwide fame, most in the Irish media, for a meeting with Pope Francis, to whom they gave an O'Neills ball. The curious picture became viral in Ireland.

They are twinned with Azur Gaels team from Nice, France.

Honours
Lazio GAA men's team won the Pan-European Junior B title in Maastricht in 2017, as well with minor trophies in Italy and France.

The ladies' team won an Italian Cup in 2016 and won the first round of Central-East European Tournament held in their city in 2018.

In August 2022 the club were proud to announce that they had signed ex Fermanagh and Antrim dual star (originally from Maguiresbridge), Issac Gerard Curran to take charge for their upcoming championship final. This proved to be a masterstroke, with little over 6 minutes on the clock remaining and an injury to star player Giovanni Murphy, Curran selected himself to take the field at number 14, resulting in a personal tally of 1.08  
(1.04 from play), and helped the team to a 1 point win.

References

External links
 Official Facebook page
 Lazio Calcio Gaelico on Europe GAA page
 Polisportiva Lazio official site
 Official website

Gaelic football clubs in Italy